The Canoe Sprint women's KL1 event at the 2016 Paralympic Games took place on 14 and 15 September 2016, at the Lagoa Rodrigo de Freitas. 
Two heats were held. Winners and runners up advanced directly to the final. The rest went into the semifinal, where the top four advanced to the final.

Heats

Heat 1 
9:00 14 September 2016:

Heat 2 
9:05 14 September 2016:

Semifinal 
10:15 14 September 2016:

Final 
9:00 15 September 2016:

Notes

Paracanoeing at the 2016 Summer Paralympics
Para